Indian Americans are citizens or residents of the United States of America who trace their family descent to India. This article is a list of notable Indian Americans.

Academics

Nobel Prize recipients
 
 Har Gobind Khorana (1922-2011), Nobel Prize in Medicine, 1968
 Subramanyan Chandrasekhar (1910-1995), Nobel Prize for Physics, 1983
 Venkatraman Ramakrishnan (b. 1952), Nobel Prize in Chemistry, 2009; Former President of the Royal Society, (2015-2020)
 Abhijit Banerjee (b. 1961), Nobel Memorial Prize in Economic Sciences, 2019; Ford Foundation International Professor of Economics at Massachusetts Institute of Technology

Deans and presidents

 Rakesh Khurana (born 1967), dean of Harvard College 
 Neeli Bendapudi (born 1962), president of University of Louisville 
 Jamshed Bharucha (born 1956), former president of Cooper Union, (2011-2015); former dean of arts & sciences at Dartmouth College and former provost at Tufts University
 Vijay K. Dhir (born 1943), former dean of the UCLA Henry Samueli School of Engineering and Applied Science, (2003-2016)
 Ravi V. Bellamkonda (born 1968), Vinik Dean of Engineering at Duke University Edmund T. Pratt Jr. School of Engineering 
 Dinesh D'Souza (born 1961), former president of The King's College, New York, (2010-2012)
 Anjli Jain (born 1981), executive director of Campus Consortium
 Dipak C. Jain (born 1957), former dean of INSEAD, (2011-2013); former dean of the Kellogg School of Management at Northwestern University, (2001-2009)
 Vistasp Karbhari, former president of the University of Texas at Arlington, (2013-2020)
 Pramod Khargonekar (born 1956), control theorist; vice chancellor of research at University of California, Irvine; former dean, College of Engineering at University of Florida, Gainesville, (2001-2009)
 Renu Khator (born 1958), chancellor of the University of Houston System and president of the University of Houston; former provost and senior vice president, University of South Florida
 Pradeep Khosla (born 1957), chancellor of the University of California, San Diego
 Vijay Kumar (born 1962), dean of the School of Engineering and Applied Science at the University of Pennsylvania
 Geeta Menon,  dean emeritus of the undergraduate college at New York University Stern School of Business
 Nitin Nohria (born 1962), former dean of Harvard Business School, (2010-2020)
 Sethuraman Panchanathan, director of National Science Foundation and former executive vice president and chief research and innovation officer at Arizona State University
 Michael Rao, president of Virginia Commonwealth University
 S. Narasinga Rao, former dean of Jackson College of Graduate Studies and Research at the University of Central Oklahoma
 Beheruz Sethna, president of the University of West Georgia
 Paul Shrivastava, chief sustainability officer and director, Sustainability Institute, Pennsylvania State University
 Molly Easo Smith, president of Manhattanville College
 Kumble R. Subbaswamy, chancellor of the University of Massachusetts Amherst
 Subra Suresh, president of Carnegie Mellon University
 Satish K. Tripathi, president of University at Buffalo
 Sundaraja Sitharama Iyengar, Ryder Professor of Computer Science and director of the School of Computing and Information Sciences at Florida International University, Miami
 S. Shankar Sastry, former dean of the UC Berkeley College of Engineering
 Bala V. Balachandran (born 1937), professor emeritus at Kellogg School of Management at Northwestern University; founder, dean and chairman of Great Lakes Institute of Management and executive professor & strategy adviser to the dean of the Bauer College of Business at University of Houston
Nagi Naganathan, president of Oregon Institute of Technology and former president and dean of the College of Engineering at the University of Toledo, (2001-2016)
Sri Zaheer, dean of Carlson School of Management at the University of Minnesota

Mathematicians
 Raj Chandra Bose (1901-1987), mathematician
 Shamit Kachru (b. 1970), Mathematical Physicist, professor at Stanford Institute for Theoretical Physics 
 Akshay Venkatesh (b. 1981), Fields Medal laureate, mathematician
 Shreeram Shankar Abhyankar (1930-2012), mathematician, singularity theory and Abhyankar's conjecture of finite group theory
 Raghu Raj Bahadur (1924-1997), statistician
 Manjul Bhargava (b. 1974),  professor of mathematics at Princeton University and winner of Fields Medal, 2014
 Rahul Pandharipande (b. 1969), joined as Professor of Mathematics at Princeton University in 2002, he accepted a Professorship at ETH Zürich
 Sarvadaman Chowla (1907-1995), mathematician specializing in number theory
 Harish-Chandra (1923-1983), mathematician, IBM Von Neumann Professor at Institute for Advanced Study, Princeton
 Narendra Karmarkar (b. 1955), mathematician, inventor of Karmarkar algorithm
 Chandrashekhar Khare (b. 1968), professor of mathematics at the University of California Los Angeles
 G. S. Maddala (1933-1999), mathematician and economist best known for work in the field of econometrics
 Anil Nerode (b. 1932), mathematician, proved the Myhill-Nerode Theorem
 Ria Persad (b. 1974), mathematician, classical musician, and model
 K. C. Sreedharan Pillai (1920-1985), mathematician
 Calyampudi Radhakrishna Rao (b. 1920), professor at Penn State University and research professor at the University of Buffalo
 S. R. Srinivasa Varadhan (b. 1940), NYU mathematician who specialised in probability; winner of the Abel Prize and Steele Prize
 DJ Patil (b. 1974), mathematician & Data scientist
 Sucharit Sarkar (b. 1983), mathematician and topologist
 Sourav Chatterjee (b. 1979), statistician, mathematician and professor at Stanford
 Kannan Soundararajan (b. 1973), mathematician, professor at Stanford and IMO medalist.
 Subhash Khot (b. 1978), mathematician, theoretical computer scientist famous for Unique games conjecture.
 Sanjeev Arora (b. 1968), mathematician, theoretical computer scientist and Gödel Prize winner.
 Kiran Kedlaya (b. 1974), mathematician

Economists

 Abhijit Banerjee (b. 1961), Ford Foundation international professor of economics at MIT
 Pranab Bardhan (b. 1939), Professor Emeritus of Economics University of California, Berkeley
 Kaushik Basu (b. 1952), C. Marks Professor of International Studies and Professor of Economics Cornell University
 Jagdish Natwarlal Bhagwati (b. 1934), professor of economics at Columbia University
 Alok Bhargava (b. 1954), professor of economics at the University of Maryland School of Public Policy
 V. V. Chari (b. 1952), professor of economics at the University of Minnesota
 Raj Chetty (b. 1979), professor of economics at Harvard University
 Srikant Datar, The 11th Dean of Harvard Business School, took charge from January 1, 2021
 Avinash Kamalakar Dixit (b. 1944), professor of economics at Princeton University
 Gita Gopinath (b. 1971),  chief economist at the International Monetary Fund and Economic Adviser to the Chief Minister of Kerala
 Reema Harrysingh-Carmona (b. 1970), economist and the 5th First Lady of Trinidad and Tobago
 Sendhil Mullainathan (b. 1973), professor of economics, Harvard University
 Arvind Panagariya (b. 1952), professor of economics at Columbia University
 Debraj Ray (b. 1957), Silver Professor of Economics, New York University
 Ruchir Sharma, chief global strategist of asset management and emerging markets equity, Morgan Stanley Investment Management
 Arvind Subramanian (b. 1959), Chief Economic Advisor Government of India and formerly an economist at the International Monetary Fund

Professors and scholars in computer science or engineering and electrical engineering 

Amit Sahai (b.1974), professor of computer science at University of California, Los Angeles, fellow of Association for Computing Machinery, 
 Amit Sheth, computer scientist at Wright State University in Dayton, Ohio
 Anant Agarwal, professor of electrical engineering and director of the Computer Science and Artificial Intelligence Laboratory at MIT
 Aravind Joshi (1929-2017), professor of computer and cognitive science at the University of Pennsylvania
 Arvind, Johnson Professor of Computer Science and Engineering at the Massachusetts Institute of Technology
 Arogyaswami Paulraj (b. 1944), professor of electrical engineering at Stanford University
 Ashwin Ram (b. 1960), head of artificial intelligence Amazon Alexa
 Avinash Kak (b. 1944), professor of electrical and computer engineering at Purdue University
 B. Jayant Baliga (b. 1948), inventor of the Insulated-gate bipolar transistor
 Bhubaneswar Mishra (b. 1961), professor of computer science, engineering & mathematics at Courant Institute of Mathematical Sciences of New York University and visiting scholar at Cold Spring Harbor Laboratory.
 Chandra Kintala (1948-2009), former Vice President Bell Labs
 Gopal H. Gaonkar (b. 1936), a professor of engineering at Florida Atlantic University
 Hari Balakrishnan, Fujitsu Chair Professor in the Department of Electrical Engineering and Computer Science at Massachusetts Institute of Technology
Hardik Gohel, a faculty of computer science at University of Houston-Victoria
 K. Mani Chandy, professor of computer science at the California Institute of Technology
 Krishna Saraswat, professor of electrical engineering at Stanford University
 Madhu Sudan, professor of computer science at Harvard University
Prabhat Mishra, professor of computer science and engineering at University of Florida
 Raj Jain, professor of computer science and engineering at Washington University School of Engineering and Applied Science
 Rangasami L. Kashyap (b. 1938), professor of electrical engineering at Purdue University
 Ricky J. Sethi, professor of computer science at Fitchburg State University; director of Research at The Madsci Network
 Saraju Mohanty, professor of computer science and engineering at the University of North Texas
Shree K. Nayar, professor of computer science at Columbia University
 Shrikanth Narayanan, award-winning researcher, inventor and educator at University of Southern California
 Shwetak Patel, professor of computer science and electrical engineering at the University of Washington
 Supriyo Datta, Thomas Duncan Distinguished Professor of Electrical and Computer Engineering at the Purdue University
 Thomas Kailath, professor of engineering at Stanford University
 Vijay Vazirani (b. 1957), professor of computer science at University of California, Irvine
Suman Datta (b. 1973), professor of electrical engineering at the University of Notre Dame, regarded as one of the greatest pioneers in semiconductor research in USA.

Professors and scholars in other disciplines 
 Amishi Jha, American neuroscientist and professor of psychology 
 Kuzhikalail M. Abraham, professor at Northeastern University, electrochemistry; materials science;  lithium,  lithium ion, and lithium air batteries
 Mrinal K. Sen, John A. and Katherine G. Jackson Chair in Applied Seismology at Jackson School of Geosciences, University of Texas at Austin.
 Nita Ahuja, Chief of Surgical Oncology at Johns Hopkins Hospital, surgeon-scientist, first women ever to lead this department at Johns Hopkins Hospital.
 Pulickel M. Ajayan, professor of material science at Rice University 
 Salman Akhtar, professor at the Jefferson Medical College
 Muzaffar Alam, professor in South Asian Languages & Civilizations at the University of Chicago
 Akhil Amar, professor of law at Yale Law School
 Vikram Amar, professor of law at the University of California, Davis School of Law
 Abhay Ashtekar, professor of physics and Director of the Institute for Gravitational Physics and Geometry  at Pennsylvania State University
 Satya N. Atluri, Presidential Chair and University Distinguished Professor Texas Tech University, Recipient, Padma Bhushan in Science and Engineering in 2013 from the President of India
 P.S. Ayyaswamy, professor of dynamical engineering at the University of Pennsylvania
 Homi K. Bhabha, Anne F. Rothenberg Professor of English and American Literature and Language, and the Director of the Mahindra Humanities Center at Harvard University
 Mahzarin Banaji, professor at Harvard University, best known for exploring implicit racial and gender biases
 Sugata Bose, professor of history at Harvard University
 Ananda Mohan Chakrabarty, professor of microbiology at University of Illinois at Chicago
 Arup Chakraborty, Robert T. Haslam Professor focusing in biophysics, computational modeling and infectious disease at Massachusetts Institute of Technology
 Naresh Dalal, Dirac Professor of Chemistry and Biochemistry at Florida State University
 Aswath Damodaran, professor of finance at the Stern School of Business at New York University
 Ashok Das, professor of physics at the University of Rochester
 Ashok Gadgil, professor of civil and environmental engineering at the University of California, Berkeley
 Rajit Gadh, professor of mechanical and aerospace engineering at University of California, Los Angeles
 Akhilesh K. Gaharwar, professor in the Department of Biomedical Engineering at Texas A&M University
 Atul Gawande, professor in the Department of Health Policy & Management at Harvard T.H. Chan School of Public Health
 Swapan K. Gayen, professor of physics at the City University of New York
 Anirvan Ghosh, professor at the University of California, San Diego
 Radhika Govindrajan, associate professor of anthropology at University of Washington
 Vijay Govindarajan, Coxe Distinguished Professor at Dartmouth College's Tuck School of Business and the Marvin Bower Fellow at Harvard Business School 
 Kausalya Hart, scholar of Tamil language at UC Berkeley
 Narayan Hosmane, professor of chemistry and biochemistry at Northern Illinois University
 Ashish Jha, Dean of Brown University School of Public Health  
 Ravi Jagannathan, professor at the Kellogg School of Management
 Jainendra K. Jain, professor of physics at Pennsylvania State University
 Piyare Jain, professor emeritus at University at Buffalo
 Rakesh Jain, professor of tumor biology at Massachusetts General Hospital in the Harvard Medical School
 S. Lochlann Jain, associate professor in the Anthropology Department at Stanford University
 Sachin H. Jain, physician and health policy analyst at Harvard Medical School
 Nazir Jairazbhoy, professor of folk and classical music of South Asia at University of California at Los Angeles
 Yogesh Jaluria, Board of Governors Professor and Distinguished Professor at Rutgers, the State University of New Jersey, in the Department of Mechanical and Aerospace Engineering.
 M. A. Muqtedar Khan, Professor in the Department of Political Science and International Relations at the University of Delaware
 Ravindra Khattree, professor of statistics at Oakland University
 Satish Nagarajaiah, professor of civil engineering and of mechanical engineering at Rice University.
 S. P. Kothari, Gordon Y Billard Professor of Management at MIT Sloan School of Management
 Shrinivas Kulkarni, professor of astrophysics and planetary science at Caltech
 Vijay Mahajan (academic), John P. Harbin Centennial Chair in Business and Professor of Marketing at University of Texas at Austin
 Raj Mittra, electrical engineering professor at Pennsylvania State University
 Jagadeesh Moodera, American physicist of Indian origin; senior research scientist at MIT's Francis Bitter Magnet Laboratory
 Bharati Mukherjee, author, professor in the department of English at the University of California, Berkeley
 C. M. Naim, scholar of Urdu language and literature at the University of Chicago
 V. Parmeswaran Nair, Physicist, currently a Distinguished Professor at City University of New York.
 Shrikanth Narayanan, award-winning researcher, inventor and educator at University of Southern California
 Jaishree Odin, professor, postmodern literary theorist at the University of Hawaii
 C.K. Prahalad, professor of corporate strategy at the Stephen M. Ross School of Business in the University of Michigan
 Vijay Prashad, professor of international studies at Trinity College
 Vilayanur S. Ramachandran, behavioral neurologist and psychophysicist; Professor with the Psychology and Neurosciences University of California, San Diego
 J. N. Reddy, professor and holder of the Oscar S. Wyatt Endowed Chair in Mechanical Engineering at Texas A&M University
 Anantanand Rambachan, professor of religion at St. Olaf College, Minnesota, United States
 K. R. Rao, professor at University of Texas at Arlington
 Subrata Roy, professor of aerospace engineering at the University of Florida
 Subir Sachdev, Herchel Smith Professor of Physics at Harvard University; Dirac Medal and National Academy of Sciences
 Nitin Samarth, Head and Professor of Physics, Pennsylvania State University
 Deepak Sarma, professor of religious studies at Case Western Reserve University
 Jagdish Sheth, professor of marketing at Goizueta Business School of Emory University
 Jagdish Shukla, professor at George Mason University
 Gayatri Chakravorty Spivak, professor at Columbia University
 Marti G. Subrahmanyam, professor of finance at the Stern School of Business at New York University
 Sanjay Subrahmanyam, holder of Navin and Pratima Doshi Chair of Indian History and scholar at UCLA
 Mriganka Sur, professor of neuroscience at the MIT
 Medha Yodh, scholar of classical Indian dance at UCLA

Activism and philanthropy

 Rajiv Malhotra, Hindu Activist for promoting Indic cultures, author of Breaking India and founder of Infinity Foundation.
 Maya Ajmera, founder of The Global Fund for Children and author of more than 20 books for children
Kala Bagai, immigrant advocate and one of the first South Asian women in the United States
 Bhairavi Desai, founding member of the Taxi Workers Alliance in New York
 Kartar Dhillon, Ghadar Party, labor, and civil rights activist
 Mallika Dutt,  executive director of Breakthrough human rights organization
 Vijaya Lakshmi Emani (1958-2009), social activist
 Arun Manilal Gandhi, fifth grandson of Mohandas Gandhi
 Meera Gandhi, founder and CEO of The Giving Back Foundation
 Abraham George, philanthropist humanitarian, founder of The George Foundation (TGF)
 Gitanjali S. Gutierrez, lawyer who is defending Guantanamo prisoners
 Maya Harris, executive director of the ACLU of Northern California and sister of Kamala Harris
 Prerna Lal, immigrant rights advocate and attorney
 Girindra Mukerji, leader of one of the first Indian-American student protests against colonialism in 1908
 Kavita Ramdas, president and CEO of Global Fund for Women
 Dinesh Sharma, leader, CRO and Director at Steam Works Studio and author in human development, human rights and global education, and professor at Walden University 
 Inder Singh, chairman of the Global Organization of People of Indian Origin (GOPIO)
 Bhagat Singh Thind, civil rights activist who defended the right of Indian immigrants to gain United States citizenship in United States v. Bhagat Singh Thind
 Urvashi Vaid, gay rights activist
 Thomas Abraham (b. 1948), founder president of the Global Organization of People of Indian Origin (GOPIO) as well as the National Federation of Indian American Associations (NFIA)
 Sakharam Ganesh Pandit (1875-1959), lawyer who argued against government efforts to revoke American citizenship for Indian emigrants 
John Prabhudoss (b.1964), current Chairman of the Federation of Indian American Christian Organizations (FIACONA)

Arts and entertainment

 
 Ashok Amritraj, Hollywood film producer
 Salma Arastu, artist
 San Banarje, independent filmmaker
 Rina Banerjee, artist
 Prashant Bhargava, director
 Niala Boodhoo, journalist, host, and executive producer 
 Jay Chandrasekhar, director, actor, comedian, and writer
 Shanthi Chandrasekar, visual artist
 Aneesh Chaganty, film director, screenwriter 
 Sabu Dastagir, actor
 Nina Davuluri, Miss America 2014
 Param Gill, director, screenwriter and producer
 Kovid Gupta, bestselling author and screenwriter 
 Reef Karim, actor, director, writer, and producer 
 Neeraj Khemlani, producer for CBS News' 60 Minutes
 Bharti Kirchner, writer
 Shirish Korde, artist
 Adam Bhala Lough, director, screenwriter
 Tirlok Malik, filmmaker and actor
 Benny Mathews, film and music video director
 Faris McReynolds, painter and musician
 Mira Nair, director and producer
 Sunil Nayar, TV writer and producer; producer of CSI: Miami
 Oopali Operajita, choreographer and Odissi and Bharatanatyam artiste; Distinguished Fellow, Carnegie Mellon University
 Yatin Patel, photographer and artist
 Mythili Prakash, Bharatanatyam dancer and choreographer
 Asha Puthli, singer-songwriter, producer and actress
 Chitra Ramanathan, contemporary visual artist, painting
 Sarayu Rao, actor and director
 Harish Saluja, filmmaker
 Stephanie Sengupta, producer and writer
 Mehul Shah, actor, director, writer, and producer
 Adi Shankar, producer and actor 
 Naren Shankar, TV writer, producer and director; an executive producer of CSI: Crime Scene Investigation
 M. Night Shyamalan, director, filmmaker
 Tarsem Singh, director
 Rohit Gupta, director, producer
 Manick Sorcar, animator, artist, and producer
 Babu Subramaniam, director
 Tina Sugandh, entertainer
 Julie Titus, model, contestant on America's Next Top Model
 Serena Varghese, voice actress
 Prashanth Venkataramanujam, television writer, actor, and producer

Actors and actresses

 Karan Soni, actor
 Utkarsh Ambudkar, actor
 Simran Judge, actor
 Ravi Patel, actor
 Devika Bhise, actress
 Waris Ahluwalia, fashion designer
 Aziz Ansari, actor and comedian
 Gabrielle Anwar, actress
 Erick Avari, actor
 Sunkrish Bala, actor
 Firdous Bamji, actor
 Purva Bedi, actress
 Summer Bishil, actress
 Karan Brar, film and TV actor
 Samrat Chakrabarti, actor
 Melanie Chandra, actress
 Michelle Khare, actress, Youtuber, and television host
 Sabu Dastagir, actor
 Sujata Day, actress
 Manish Dayal, actor
 Noureen DeWulf, actress
 Raja Fenske, actor
 Janina Gavankar, actress
 Namrata Singh Gujral, actress
 Sakina Jaffrey, actress
 Poorna Jagannathan, actress and producer
 Avan Jogia, actor
 Avantika Vandanapu, actress and dancer. Known for her role in 2021 film, Spin
 Mindy Kaling, actress, writer, producer, comedian
 Ravi Kapoor, actor
 Rahul Kohli, actor 
 Deep Katdare, actor
 Nivedita Kulkarni, actress
 Shishir Kurup, actor
 Nakul Dev Mahajan, Bollywood dancer and choreographer
 Sunny Leone, actor and former pornographic actress
 Tirlok Malik, actor
 Shelly Malil, film and TV actor
 Rizwan Manji, actor
 Aasif Mandvi, actor
 Sunita Mani, actress
 Ajay Mehta, TV actor
 Ajay Naidu, actor
 Anjul Nigam, actor

 Maulik Pancholy, actor
 Devika Parikh, actress
 Kal Penn, actor
 Danny Pudi, actor
 Ritesh Rajan, actor
 Sendhil Ramamurthy, actor
 Dileep Rao, actor
 Navi Rawat, actress
 Sonal Shah, actress
 Sheetal Sheth, actress
 Zenobia Shroff, Indian-American actress and comedienne
 Tiya Sircar, actress
 Omi Vaidya, actor
 Sugith Varughese,Indian-born Canadian-born actor with American citizenship
 Annet Mahendru, actress
 Nitya Vidyasagar, actress
 Nandana Sen, actress
 Pooja Batra, actress
 Monica Dogra, actress
 Deepti Naval, actress

Comedians

 Aziz Ansari
 Aman Ali
 Arj Barker
 Aasif Mandvi
 Jay Chandrasekhar
 Hari Kondabolu
Hasan Minhaj
 Nimesh Patel
 Adam Mamawala
 Rajiv Satyal
 Anish Shah
 Paul Varghese, appeared on Last Comic Standing
 Aparna Nancherla

Culinary arts
 Ashok Bajaj, restaurateur
 Vishwesh Bhatt, chef
 Maneet Chauhan, celebrity chef, restaurateur, author
 H. Jay Dinshah, founded the American Vegan Society
 Raghavan Iyer, chef, author, culinary educator
 Vikas Khanna, Michelin starred celebrity chef, restaurateur, author, filmmaker, and TV host
 Jehangir Mehta, celebrity chef, restaurateur, author
 Rajat Parr, sommelier
 Suvir Saran, Michelin starred chef and author
 Aarti Sequeira (b. 1978), TV host on Food Network
 Vikram Sunderam (b. 1967), chef and author
 Padma Lakshmi

Fashion designers
 Naeem Khan
 Vashtie Kola
 Bibhu Mohapatra
 Rachel Roy (b. 1974)
 Sachin & Babi

Models
 Anchal Joseph, contestant on Cycle 7 of America's Next Top Model
 Pooja Kumar, model
 Akshay Kapoor, model, actor

Media

 Manu Raju (b. 1980), CNN journalist anchor, reporter
 Deepak Ananthapadmanabha, online journalist
 Sanjay Gupta, journalist, medical correspondent, neurosurgeon 
 Rajiv Chandrasekaran, assistant managing editor for continuous news, The Washington Post; author of Imperial Life in the Emerald City 
 Syma Chowdhry, television host, reporter, and producer
 Priya David, correspondent for CBS News
 Dinesh D'Souza, political commentator, author and filmmaker. Former president of The King's College, New York
 Deepa Fernandes, host of the WBAI radio program Wakeup Call
 Deepti Hajela, journalist for the Associated Press
 Pico Iyer, author and journalist for Time magazine, Harper's Magazine, Condé Nast Traveler, and The New York Review of Books
 Shibani Joshi, reporter for the Fox Business Network
 Sukanya Krishnan, news anchor for CW 11 Morning News on WPIX
 Seema Mody, news reporter/anchor for CNBC
 Mish Michaels, meteorologist for the WBZ-TV Weather Team
 Vinita Nair, anchor of World News Now and America This Morning on ABC
 Kevin Negandhi, sports anchor for ESPN SportsCenter
 Reena Ninan, Middle East correspondent for Fox News Channel
 Asra Nomani, journalist
 Safiya Nygaard, YouTube beauty creator
 Uma Pemmaraju, senior news anchor for Fox News Channel
 Ramesh Ponnuru, senior editor of the National Review magazine
 Ash-har Quraishi, correspondent, WTTW Chicago; former KCTV Chief Investigative Reporter; former CNN Islamabad Bureau Chief
 Gopal Raju, pioneer of Indian American ethnic media
 Aneesh Raman, first Indian-American presidential speechwriter under President Barack Obama, former CNN Middle East correspondent
 Alpana Singh, television personality
 Lakshmi Singh, NPR's national midday newscaster
 Hari Sreenivasan, correspondent for CBS News and the PBS NewsHour
 Sreenath Sreenivasan, Columbia University professor; WABC-TV technology reporter
 Ali Velshi, business news anchor for CNN
 Zain Verjee, CNN anchor
 Rohit Vyas, first and longest serving Indian American broadcast journalist
 Fareed Zakaria, columnist for Time magazine and host of Fareed Zakaria GPS on CNN
 Lilly Singh, YouTuber of Indian descent widely known as IISuperwomanII, ranked tenth on the Forbes list of the world's highest paid YouTube stars, ranked first on 2017 Forbes Top Influencers List in the entertainment category
 Liza Koshy, actress, YouTube comedian and television host

Musicians

 Rick Parashar (1963-2014), producer
 Sandeep Das (b. 1971), won the Grammy award for Best World Music Album, at the 59th Grammy Awards, 2017
 Sonika Vaid, Indian-American singer
 Bamboo Shoots, dance-rock band
 6ix, record producer
 Rajiv Dhall, Indian-American singer
 Sid Sriram, Indian-American singer
 Jeff Bhasker, producer
 Nicki Minaj, rapper and singer-songwriter
 Sameer Bhattacharya, one of two guitarists in the Texas alternative rock band Flyleaf
 Das Racist, alternative hip hop group; two of the three members are Indian
 Anoop Desai, finalist on the eighth season of American Idol
 Falu, singer and songwriter	
 Sameer Gadhia, lead vocalist in Young the Giant
 Heems, rapper
 Ravi Hutheesing, singer-songwriter, guitarist 
 iLoveMakonnen, rapper	
 Daya, singer
 Sandeep Khurana, new age music and world music composer 
 Raja Kumari, singer and songwriter
 Vijay Iyer, jazz musician and composer
 Sunny Jain, dhol player, drummer, and composer	
 Norah Jones, singer, songwriter and actress; winner of multiple Grammy Awards
 Rajan Somasundaram, Music Composer, Songwriter and multi instrumentalist 
 Karsh Kale, Indian producer, composer and musician
 Tony Kanal, two-time Grammy Award winner, bass player for No Doubt
 Savan Kotecha, songwriter
 KSHMR, electronic musician, record producer
 Arun Luthra, jazz musician
 Sanjaya Malakar, finalist on the sixth season of  American Idol
 Mathai, finalist on season 2 of The Voice
 Zarin Mehta, executive director of the New York Philharmonic Orchestra
 Zubin Mehta, former conductor, New York Philharmonic Orchestra; receiver of a star on the Hollywood Walk of Fame
 Sanjay Mishra, guitarist and composer
 Vidya Vox, YouTube musician	
 Vasant Rai, performer of Indian music	
 Paul Sabu, producer
 Amar Sandhu, singer	
 Shaheen Sheik, songwriter	
 Bikram Singh, singer
 Mickey Singh, Indian-born singer from Detroit, MI 
 Ramesh Srivastava, singer 
 Ambi Subramaniam, violinist and composer
 Bindu Subramaniam, singer-songwriter
 Kim Thayil, named among 100th greatest guitarists of all time by Rolling Stone
 Zoya, California-based singer and guitarist
 Sanjay Patel, animator and director and also illustrator of Pixar
 Shirish Korde (b. 1945), composer
 Dave Baksh (b. 1980), guitarist of punk band Sum 41
 Raveena Aurora, alternative singer and songwriter

Business

 Parag Agrawal, former CEO of Twitter
 Anu Aiyengar, managing director of North American mergers and acquisitions of JPMorgan Chase & Co
 Nikesh Arora (b. 1968), CEO, Palo Alto Networks, former Google executive and COO, Softbank
 Samir Arora, former CEO of Mode Media
 Ramani Ayer, former chairman and CEO of The Hartford Financial Services Group
 Prith Banerjee, managing director of Global Technology R&D at Accenture
 Somen Banerjee, co-founder of Chippendales
 Ajay Banga, president and CEO of MasterCard
 Mahaboob Ben Ali (1927-2009), co-founder of Ben's Chili Bowl
 Manoj Bhargava, founder and CEO of Innovations Ventures LLC; the company is known for producing the 5-hour Energy drink
 Aneel Bhusri, co-founder and CEO of Workday, Inc.; partner at Greylock Partners; member of the board of directors of Intel
 Jagjeet (Jeet) S. Bindra, director of Edison International, Southern California Edison
 Amar Bose, founder and chairman of Bose Corporation
 Vanu Bose, American electrical engineer, founder of Vanu Inc, son of Amar Bose
 Sant Singh Chatwal, owner of the Bombay Palace chain of restaurants and Hampshire Hotels & Resorts
 Manu Daftary, money manager 
 Bharat Desai, co-founder and chairman of Syntel
 Gururaj Deshpande, founder of Sycamore Networks
 Francis deSouza, CEO of Illumina
 Vinod Dham, designed the Intel Pentium Chip Processor; the "father of the Pentium Chip"
 Rono Dutta, former president of United Airlines, chairman of Air Sahara
 Rhona Fox, founder of Fox Fuse
 Rakesh Gangwal, former CEO and chairman of US Airways Group
 Asim Ghosh, president and chief executive officer at Husky Energy
 Ajit Gupta, founder and CEO of Speedera Networks, Aryaka Networks
 Rajat Gupta, former managing director of McKinsey & Company
 Rajiv Gupta, CEO of SkyHigh Networks, former general manager of Hewlett-Packard
 Umang Gupta, former CEO of Keynote Systems, Inc.
 Ajit Jain, president of Berkshire Hathaway Reinsurance Group
 Anjli Jain, founder and Managing Partner of EVC Ventures
 Anshu Jain, President of Cantor Fitzgerald and former co-CEO of Deutsche Bank
 Sanjay Jha, CEO of Global Foundries and former CEO of Motorola Mobile Devices
 Vyomesh Joshi, former executive vice president of Imaging and Printing Group, Hewlett-Packard
 John Kapoor, founder and executive chairman of Insys Therapeutics
 Vinod Khosla, founder of Khosla Ventures, co-founder of Sun Microsystems
 Jay Vijayan, founder of Tekion Corp., former CIO of Tesla
 Arvind Krishna, CEO of IBM
 Anil Kumar, former senior partner and chairman, Asia Center of McKinsey & Company
 Sanjay Kumar, former CEO of Computer Associates International
 Thomas Kurian, CEO of Google Cloud, former President of product development at Oracle Corporation
 Sachin Lawande, president and CEO of Visteon
 Krishna Maharaj, businessman convicted of murder
 Bobby Mehta, former CEO and vice chairman of HSBC North America and former CEO of Transunion Company
 Sonny Mehta, Chairman/Editor in chief of Alfred A. Knopf
 Victor Menezes, chairman of Clearing House Association, former chairman and CEO of Citibank 
 Satya Nadella, CEO of Microsoft
 Ranji H. Nagaswami, chief investment officer for AllianceBernstein Fund Investors
 Lakshmi Narayanan, vice chairman and former CEO of Cognizant Corporation
 Shantanu Narayen, CEO of Adobe Systems
 Indra Nooyi, former chairman and CEO of PepsiCo
 Dinesh Paliwal, chairman and CEO of Harman International
 Vikram Pandit, former CEO of Citigroup
 Suhas Patil, entrepreneur, venture capitalist & Founder of Cirrus Logic
 Sundar Pichai, CEO of Google, Alphabet Inc
 Prakash Puram, president and CEO of iXmatch
 Vivek Ranadivé, former CEO of TIBCO Software
 Naval Ravikant, co-founder, chairman and former CEO of AngelList, investor, and entrepreneur 
 Sashi Reddi, serial entrepreneur, venture capitalist, angel investor, technologist, and philanthropist
 Kanwal Rekhi, former EVP and CTO of Novell
 Ashutosh Saxena, Founder & CEO of Caspar.AI, prolific author in the area of AI, and former Professor of Computer Science at Cornell University.
 Abbas Sadriwala, chairman and CEO of the Fort Lauderdale-based Wireless Logix Group
 Arun Sarin, former president of Vodafone
 Niraj Shah, CEO and co-founder of Wayfair
 Deven Sharma, former president of Standard & Poor's
 Ram Shriram, venture fund capitalist and one of the first investors in Google
 Pradeep Sindhu, founder and CTO of Juniper Networks
 K. R. Sridhar, founder and CEO of Bloom Energy
 Rajeev Suri, CEO of Nokia
 Balaji Srinivasan, co-founder of Counsyl, former CTO of Coinbase, and former general partner at Andreessen Horowitz
 Abhi Talwalkar, president and CEO of LSI Corporation
 Thiru Vikram, CEO of Buffalo Automation
 Romesh Wadhwani, founder, chairman and CEO of Symphony Technology Group
 Padmasree Warrior, CEO of Nio (car company)

Literature

 Abraham Verghese, doctor and author; wrote In My Own Country and My Tennis Partner
 Agha Shahid Ali, poet
 Aimee Nezhukumatathil, poet
 Alka Joshi, author
 Amitav Ghosh, Indo-nostalgic writer and winner of Prix Médicis étranger
 Anita Desai, novelist; shortlisted for the Booker Prize three times; mother of Kiran Desai
 Anju Hasan, author, of Neti,Neti
 Anu Garg, author, speaker, and computer engineer
 Arnold Rampersad, biographer and literary critic
 Bhaskar Sunkara, political writer, founding editor and publisher of Jacobin and current publisher of London's Tribune
 Bharati Mukherjee, author, professor 
 Chitra Banerjee Divakaruni, author
 Davan Maharaj, journalist and former editor-in-chief and publisher of the Los Angeles Times
 Dhan Gopal Mukerji, first successful Indian man of letters in the US; winner of the Newbery Medal, 1928
 Gaiutra Bahadur, author
 Ghalib Shiraz Dhalla, author
 Indira Viswanathan Peterson, literary critic
 Indu Sundaresan, author
 Ismat Chughtai, author
 Janaki Ram, author
 Jhumpa Lahiri, Pulitzer Prize-winning author
 Kaavya Viswanathan, novelist
 Kiran Desai, winner of the 2006 Man Booker Prize
 Parag Khanna, author
 Paul Kalanithi, author
 Rajiv Joseph, playwright
 Ramya Ramana, poet
 Ravi Batra, bestselling author and economist
 Ravi Shankar, poet
 Rishi Reddi, author
 Roshani Chokshi novelist
 Rupi Kaur, poet
 S. T. Joshi, literary critic
 Salman Rushdie, novelist and essayist
 Saumitra Saxena, Hindi poet, Bharatiya Jnanpith Navlekhana Award winner
 Shauna Singh Baldwin, novelist, winner of the Commonwealth Writers' Prize
 Siddharth Katragadda, author, filmmaker, artist
 Siddhartha Mukherjee, physician, scientist and writer, 2011 winner of the Pulitzer Prize for General Non-Fiction
 Susham Bedi, author
 Thrity Umrigar, author of Bombay Time
 Tulika Mehrotra, author, journalist
 Usha Haley, author
 Vijay Prashad, Marxist writer, director for Tricontinental, Chief editor for LeftWord Books, written 30 books
 Vijay Seshadri, Pulitzer Prize-winning poet and essayist
 Vikram Seth, poet, novelist, travel writer, librettist, children's writer, biographer and memoirist

Military

 Uday Singh Taunque, first Indian American to die in Operation Iraqi Freedom; posthumously awarded Bronze Star and Purple Heart gallantry awards 
 Sunita Williams (b. 1965), astronaut and former Navy officer

Politics and government

Elected officials

Sara Gideon - former Speaker of the Maine House of Representatives (Democrat)
Ram Villivalam- State Senator, 8th District- Illinois (Democrat)
 John Abraham, former mayor of Teaneck, New Jersey (Republican) 
 Suhas Subramanyam (b. 1986), Virginia's 87th House of Delegates district Representative (Democrat)
 Saqib Ali, former member of the Maryland House of Delegates (Democratic) 
 Harvinder "Harry" Anand, mayor of Laurel Hollow, New York (Republican) 
 Sam Arora, member of the Maryland House of Delegates (Democratic) 
 Kumar P. Barve, member of the Maryland House of Delegates, former (majority leader) (Democratic), the first Indian American elected to a state legislature 
 Ravinder Bhalla, mayor, Hoboken, Hudson County, New Jersey (Democratic), the first turban-wearing Sikh American mayor in the United States to be elected by a municipality's residents, in November 2017
 Satveer Chaudhary, former Minnesota State Senator (Democratic)
 Upendra J. Chivukula, member of the New Jersey General Assembly (Democratic) 
 Swati Dandekar (b. 1951), Iowa State Senator (Democratic) 
 Mervyn M. Dymally, 41st Lieutenant Governor of California (1975–1979);  member of the U.S. House of Representatives (1981–1993) (Democratic) 
 Kashmir Gill, mayor of Yuba City, California, first Indian-American mayor in CA and first Sikh mayor in the US (Republican)
 Jay Goyal, member of the Ohio State Representative (Democratic) 
 Raj Goyle, member of the Kansas State Representative (Democratic) 
 Faz Husain, first native of India to win elected office in Michigan (Democratic) 
 Nimi McConigley, first Indian American women to serve in any American State legislature served in the Wyoming State Legislature from 1994 until 1996(Republican)
 Ameya Pawar, served as the alderman for the 47th Ward of the City of Chicago 
 Aruna Miller, member of the Maryland House of Delegates (Democratic) 
 Kshama Sawant, member of the Seattle City Council.
 Balvir Singh, first Indian American member, Board of Chosen Freeholders, Burlington County, New Jersey, first Sikh American to win a countywide election in New Jersey, in November 2017 (Democratic)
 Jenifer Rajkumar, Lower Manhattan district leader and candidate for the New York State Assembly (Democratic)

Federal elected officials

 Kamala Harris (b. 1964), current Vice President of the United States, former and 32nd Attorney General of California, former U.S. Senator from California
 Ami Bera, U.S. Representative for California's 7th congressional district
 Shri Thanedar, U.S. Representative for Michigan's 13th congressional district
 Raja Krishnamoorthi, U.S. Representative for Illinois's 8th congressional district
 Ro Khanna, U.S. Representative for California's 17th congressional district
 Pramila Jayapal, U.S. Representative for Washington's 7th congressional district
 Dalip Singh Saund, first Asian and Indian American member of the U.S. House of Representatives from California

Civil servants 

 Arif Alikhan (b. 1968), former Assistant Secretary for Policy Development at the U.S. Department of Homeland Security; former Deputy Mayor for Homeland Security and Public Safety for the City of Los Angeles; former senior adviser to Attorneys General John Ashcroft and Alberto Gonzales
 Preeta D. Bansal (b. 1965), member and past chair of the United States Commission on International Religious Freedom; former Solicitor General of New York
 Cathy Bissoon, judge for the United States District Court for the Western District of Pennsylvania (Democratic)
 Nisha Desai Biswal, current Assistant Secretary of State for South and Central Asian Affairs
 Saikat Chakrabarti, chief of staff to Alexandria Ocasio-Cortez, the U.S. representative from New York's 14th congressional district representing parts of The Bronx and Queens in New York City
 Joy Cherian, first Asian head of the Equal Employment Opportunity Commission
 Aneesh Chopra, Federal Chief Technology Officer of the U.S.
 Har Dayal, founder of the Ghadar Party
 Sabrina De Sousa, ex-CIA officer; is suing the US government for diplomatic immunity
 Gurbir Grewal, Bergen County, New Jersey prosecutor, first Sikh American county prosecutor in the U.S.,
 Vanita Gupta, Former Lawyer for ACLU and current United States Associate Attorney General
 Nikki Haley, former U.S. Ambassador to the United Nations; former Governor of South Carolina (Republican)
 Rashad Hussain, U.S. Special Envoy to the Organisation of Islamic Cooperation
 Neel Kashkari, former interim Assistant Secretary of the Treasury for Financial Stability in the United States Department of the Treasury (Republican)
 Neal Katyal, Solicitor General of the United States
 Atul Keshap, U.S. Ambassador to Sri Lanka and Maldives
 Gopal Khanna, chief information officer of Minnesota
 Narayana Kocherlakota, president of Federal Reserve Bank of Minneapolis
 Kris Kolluri, New Jersey Commissioner of Transportation

 Vivek Kundra, Federal Chief Information Officer of the US
 Arun Majumdar, director of the U.S. Department of Energy's Advanced Research Projects Agency-Energy
 Raj Mukherji (b. 1984), Deputy Mayor of Jersey City, New Jersey; candidate for the New Jersey State Legislature
 Shekar Narasimhan, co-chair of the Democratic National Committee Indo-American Council
 Ajit Pai, serving as chairman at the Federal Communications Commission
 Farah Pandith, Special Representative to Muslim Communities for the United States Department of State
 Rachel Paulose, former United States Attorney for the District of Minnesota
 Rajiv Shah (b. 1973), former Under Secretary of Agriculture for Research, Education, and Economics; former Administrator of USAID; President, Rockefeller Foundation
 Sonal Shah, member of the Obama-Biden Transition Project advisory board
 Islam A. Siddiqui, Chief Agricultural Negotiator in the Office of the United States Trade Representative
 Daleep Singh, former U.S. Deputy National Security Advisor; former Executive Vice President & Head of Markets at New York Fed   
 Sabita Singh, first judge of Indian descent in Massachusetts history
 Subra Suresh, director of National Science Foundation
 Vinai Thummalapally (b. 1954), served as U.S. Ambassador to Belize
 Richard Verma (b. 1968), Assistant Secretary for Legislative and Intergovernmental Affairs, at the Department of State
 Surya Yalamanchili, 2010 US Congressional candidate

Federal judges
 Vince Girdhari Chhabria, judge of the United States District Court for the Northern District of California
Nicholas Ranjan, District Judge, United States District Court for the Western District of Pennsylvania
 Neomi Rao, judge of the United States Court of Appeals for the District of Columbia Circuit
 Manish S. Shah, judge of the United States District Court for the Northern District of Illinois
 Srikanth Srinivasan, judge of the United States Court of Appeals for the District of Columbia Circuit
 Indira Talwani, judge of the United States District Court for the District of Massachusetts
 Amul Thapar, judge of the United States Court of Appeals for the Sixth Circuit

Religion and spirituality

 Bikram Choudhury (b. 1944), yoga guru and  founder of Bikram Yoga 
 Eknath Easwaran, spiritual teacher, author, and translator of Indian religious texts such as the Bhagavad Gita and the Upanishads
 Earl K. Fernandes, Bishop-Elect of the Roman Catholic Diocese of Columbus
 Chitrabhanu Jain, founded the Jain Meditation International Center in Manhattan, New York CityHarbhajan Singh Khalsa, introduced Kundalini Yoga and Sikhism to the US
 Padmanabh Jaini, scholar of Jainism
 Harbhajan Singh Khalsa, introduced Kundalini Yoga and Sikhism to the US
 Sushil Kumarji, Jain Acharya
 Dipa Ma, yoga teacher
 Eboo Patel, member of the New Faith Advisory Council
 Anantanand Rambachan, Hindu scholar, author, and professor of religion at St. Olaf College
 Prem Rawat, also known as Guru Maharaji Ji, head of the Divine Light Mission and later organizations
 Muzammil Siddiqi, Ph.D., chairman, Fiqh Council of North America
 Ravi Zacharias, Christian evangelist and apologist

Science and technology

 Yellapragada Subbarow (1895-1948), pioneering biochemist who discovered ATP, the human body's energy molecule.
 Ajay Bhatt (b. 1957), co-inventor of the USB; Chief Client Platform Architect at Intel
 Ajit V. Pai, chairman of the United States Federal Communications Commission (FCC)
 Ajit Varki, physician-scientist
 Amar Gopal Bose, PhD in electrical engineering, founder and chairman of Bose Corporation 
 Bimal Kumar Bose, pioneer in power electronics
 Amit Goyal, scientist and inventor
 Amit Singhal, Google Fellow, the designation the company reserves for its elite master engineers in the area of "ranking algorithm"
 Amitabha Ghosh, the only Asian on NASA's Mars Pathfinder mission
 Anil Dash, blogger and technologist
 Anirvan Ghosh, neuroscientist
 Govindjee, biochemist
 Arjun Makhijani, electrical and nuclear engineer; president of the Institute for Energy and Environmental Research
 Arun Netravali, scientist; former president of Bell Labs; former CTO of Lucent; pioneer of digital technology, including HDTV and MPEG4
 Arvind Rajaraman, theoretical physicist and string theorist
 Avtar Saini, co-led the development of the Pentium processor Intel; holds seven patents related to microprocessor design
 Bedabrata Pain, co-inventor of the active pixel sensor
 C. Kumar N. Patel, developed the carbon dioxide laser, used as a cutting tool in surgery and industry
 Deepak Pandya, neuroanatomist
 Arati Prabhakar, director of DARPA
 Dhairya Dand, inventor and artist
 DJ Patil, Chief Data Scientist of the United States Office of Science and Technology Policy
 George Sudarshan, physicist, author; first to propose the existence of the tachyon
 Jogesh Pati, theoretical physicist at the University of Maryland, College Park
 Kalpana Chawla, NASA space shuttle astronaut, who died in space shuttle blast
 Khem Shahani, microbiologist who conducted pioneer research on probiotics; discovered the DDS-1 strain of Lactobacillus acidophilus
 Krishan Sabnani, engineer and senior vice president of the Networking Research Laboratory at Alcatel-Lucent Bell Labs in New Jersey
 Krishna Bharat, principal scientist at Google; created Google News	
 Kuzhikalail M. Abraham, pioneer in lithium and lithium ion battery technologies, professor, Northeastern university, Boston, Massachusetts and president, E-KEM Sciences, Needham, Massachusetts
 Mahadev Satyanarayanan, computer science professor at Carnegie Mellon University; pioneer of research in mobile and pervasive computing
 Mani Lal Bhaumik, contributor to excimer laser technology
 Mathukumalli Vidyasagar, control theorist
 Narinder Singh Kapany, physicist, the "father of fiber optics"
 Nalini Nadkarni, ecologist who pioneered the study of Costa Rican rain forest canopies
 Noshir Gowadia, design engineer
 Om Malik, technology journalist and blogger
 Pran Nath, theoretical physicist at Northeastern University
 Pranav Mistry, Sixth Sense Project
 Raj Reddy, founder of the Robotics Institute at Carnegie Mellon University; winner of the Turing Award
 Raja Chari, astronaut chosen for Artemis moon mission
 Rajeev Motwani, professor, angel investor
 Rajiv Dutta, technology manager
 Ramesh K. Agarwal, aviation pioneer; William Palm Professor of Engineering at Washington University
 Ramesh Raskar, Femto-camera inventor, MIT Professor
 Rangaswamy Srinivasan, member of the Inventors' Hall of Fame for pioneering work on excimer laser surgery
 Ruchi Sanghvi, first female engineer of Facebook; former VP of Operations, Dropbox
 Sabeer Bhatia, co-founder of Hotmail	
 Samir Mitragotri, professor of chemical engineering and bioengineering at University of California, Santa Barbara
Sasikanth Manipatruni, Pioneer in the area of Spintronics, Silicon Photonics, Optomechanics and In Memory Computing 
 Satya N. Atluri, aerospace and mechanics, Excellence in Aviation Medal, FAA, 1998; Recipient of Padma Bhushan in 2013 in Science & Engineering from the President of India, elected to membership to National Academies of Engineering, USA (1996) and India (1997)
 Salman Khan, founder of Khan Academy
 Sharmila Bhattacharya, head of the Biomodel Performance and Behavior laboratory at NASA Ames Research Center
 VA Shiva Ayyadurai, inventor, scientist, former guest lecturer at MIT
 Siddhartha Mukherjee, scientist, physician, winner of Pulitzer Prize for General Non-Fiction
 Siva S. Banda, aerospace engineer and researcher, recipient of a Silver Medal from the Royal Aeronautical Society, a Presidential Rank Award, and elected to membership in the National Academy of Engineering
 Subhash Kak, head of the Computer Science department at Oklahoma State University
 Subrah Iyar, co-founder and CEO of Webex Communications
 Subrata Roy, plasma physicist, professor of aerospace engineering at University of Florida, inventor of the Wingless Electromagnetic Air Vehicle
 Sunita Williams, NASA astronaut
 Shya Chitaley - Paleo botanist
 Swapan Chattopadhyay, particle accelerator physicist 
 Swati Mohan, NASA space engineer 
 Thomas Anantharaman, computer statistician specializing in Bayesian inference
 Thomas Zacharia, computational scientist
 V. Mohan Reddy, pediatric cardiothoracic surgeon at Stanford
 Vamsi Mootha, physician-scientist and computational biologist	
 Vic Gundotra, former senior vice president, Engineering for Google
 Vijay Raghunath Pandharipande, physicist
 Vineeta Rastogi, public health worker
 Sirisha Bandla, space engineer

Medicine

 Amit Patel, cardiovascular surgeon and stem cell researcher; first person to inject stem cells directly into the heart
 Anita Goel, Harvard-MIT physicist, physician; expert in nanobiophysics and nanotechnology; chairman and CEO of Nanobiosym; inventor of Gene-RADAR technology
 Ashutosh Tewari, professor of urology at New York Presbyterian Hospital; prostate cancer surgeon
 Atul Gawande, general and endocrine surgeon, professor, medical author, and National Book Award finalist
 Balamurali Ambati, world's youngest doctor, at age 17
 Deepak Chopra, alternative medicine advocate, author and public speaker
 E. Premkumar Reddy, oncologist; director of Fels institute of cancer research and molecular biology at Temple University
 Harvinder Sahota, cardiologist; inventor of the FDA-approved perfusion balloon angioplasty; holds patents of 24 other medical inventions
 Inder Verma, Professor of Molecular Biology in the Laboratory of Genetics at Salk Institute for Biological Studies and University of California, San Diego
 Joia Mukherjee, associate professor with the Division of Global Health Equity at the Brigham and Women's Hospital and the Department of Global Health and Social Medicine at Harvard Medical School 
 Lall Ramnath Sawh, urologist and a pioneer of kidney transplantation in the Caribbean
 Paul Antony, MD, MPH, chief medical officer for the Pharmaceutical Research and Manufacturers of America (PhRMA)
 Ragavendra R. Baliga, FACC, FACP, FRCP (Edin), Professor of Medicine at; Ohio State University College of Medicine
 Sangeeta Bhatia, Harvard-MIT doctor and scientist; engineer of artificial liver cells
 Sanjay Gupta, neurosurgeon; CNN chief medical correspondent;
 Vivek Murthy (b. 1977), 19th and former Surgeon General of the United States; former vice admiral of U.S. Public Health Service Commissioned Officer Corps
 Aseem Shukla (b. 1972), Professor of Surgery (Urology) at the Perelman School of Medicine at the University of Pennsylvania, co-founder of Hindu American Foundation.

Sports

 Prakash Amritraj (b. 1983), tennis player (born in the US)
 Stephen Amritraj (b. 1984), tennis player
 Sanjay Beach (b. 1966), former NFL wide receiver; played for the San Francisco 49ers and the Green Bay Packers
 Mohini Bhardwaj, second Indian American Olympic medalist, 2004 Summer Olympics silver medalist in gymnastics
 Vinay Bhat, chess grandmaster
 Raj Bhavsar, third Indian American Olympic medalist, 2008 Summer Olympics bronze medalist in the team gymnastics competition
 Shaun Bridgmohan, jockey
 Brandon Chillar, NFL player, linebacker for the Green Bay Packers (father of Indian descent)
 Sean Desai (b. 1983), NFL coach and defensive coordinator for the Chicago Bears
 Jignesh Desai, cricketer
 Sonjay Dutt, TNA pro wrestler
 The Great Khali, WWE pro wrestler
 Alexi Grewal, first Indian American to win an Olympic medal, gold medalist in 1984 Summer Olympics in cycling
 Sunil Gulati, former President of the United States Soccer Federation
 Carlos Cordeiro, President of the United States Soccer Federation
 Amjad Khan, cricketer 
 Ibrahim Khaleel, cricketer
 Noshtush Kenjige, cricketer 
 Thirunavukkarasu Kumaran, cricketer
 Iris Kyle, professional bodybuilder
 Anil Lashkari, cricketer 
 Sanjay Lal, wide receivers coach for the Dallas Cowboys 
 Manny Malhotra, NHL hockey player
 Rajiv Maragh, jockey
 Aditya Mishra, cricketer
 Sushil Nadkarni, American cricketer
 Ami Parekh, figure skater
 Japen Patel, cricketer 
 Mrunal Patel, cricketer 
 Sagar Patel, cricketer
 Timil Patel, cricketer
 Laxmi Poruri, tennis player
 Tara Prasad, figure skater
 Abhimanyu Rajp, cricketer
 Rajeev Ram, tennis player
 Annand Mahendra "Victor" Ramdin, professional poker player and philanthropist
 Sunitha Rao, tennis player
 Srini Santhanam, cricketer 
 Jessy Singh, cricketer
 Monank Patel, USA cricket captain
 Saurabh Netravalkar, USA cricket captain
 Jaskaran Malhotra, cricketer
 Shikha Uberoi, tennis player
 Neha Uberoi, tennis player
 Shiva Vashishat, cricketer
 Adeel Alam, professional wrestler best known ring name Mustafa Ali (Indian mother)
 Abhimanyu Mishra, chess grandmaster
 Kanak Jha, Table Tennis player

See also
 Non-resident Indian and Person of Indian Origin
 India–United States relations

References 

Lists of American people of Asian descent

American
Lists of American people by ethnic or national origin
Lists of people by ethnicity
American